Madison Park may refer to:

 Madison Square Park, in Manhattan, New York City
 Madison Park (Madison Street Park), a park in Hoboken, New Jersey
 Madison Park (Seattle), a park in Seattle, Washington
 Madison Park, Seattle, a neighborhood in Seattle
 Madison Park, Baltimore, a neighborhood in Baltimore, Maryland
 Madison Park (musical duo), an electronica band
 Madison Park, New Jersey
 Madison Park, a book publishing imprint of Pacific Publishing Studio in Seattle, Washington